Q Center is an LGBT community center and non-profit organization located in Portland, Oregon, in the United States.

History

The community center was established in 2005, championed by then-city Commissioner Sam Adams. Kendall Clawson, an African American lesbian, served as its first executive director. The center relocated to North Mississippi Avenue in 2009.

References

External links

 
 
 Q Center at Travel Portland
 "Just Out and Portland Q Center form Strategic Partnership" (September 12, 2012), Just Out
 Midnight in the Garden of Good and Evil: The Q Center's Winter Fundraiser Gala (and Afterparty) by Marjorie Skinner (January 31, 2014), Portland Mercury

2005 establishments in Oregon
501(c)(3) organizations
Boise, Portland, Oregon
LGBT community centers in the United States
LGBT culture in Portland, Oregon
North Portland, Oregon
Organizations based in Portland, Oregon